Alisher Chingizov is a Tajik butterfly and freestyle swimmer. He competed at the 2008 Summer Olympics.

External links

Alisher Chingizov

Living people
Swimmers at the 2008 Summer Olympics
Olympic swimmers of Tajikistan
Tajikistani male freestyle swimmers
Tajikistani male butterfly swimmers
Swimmers at the 2010 Asian Games
Year of birth missing (living people)
Place of birth missing (living people)
Asian Games competitors for Tajikistan